Roberts–Carter House was a historic home located near Gatesville, Gates County, North Carolina.  It was built about 1830, and was a two-story three-bay, Federal dwelling with a side-hall plan.  It was remodeled about 1860 to add Greek Revival style front and rear double-tier porticos.  Also on the property are a contributing kitchen (c. 1900) and smokehouse. It was destroyed by a tornado in 1984.

It was listed on the National Register of Historic Places in 1984.

References

Houses on the National Register of Historic Places in North Carolina
Federal architecture in North Carolina
Greek Revival houses in North Carolina
Houses completed in 1830
Houses in Gates County, North Carolina
National Register of Historic Places in Gates County, North Carolina
1830 establishments in North Carolina